This is a list of the 17 members of the European Parliament for Bulgaria in the 2009 to 2014 session. One person from Democrats for a Strong Bulgaria entered the Parliament in December 2011.

List

Notes

2009
List
Bulgaria